Nusantara Futsal League
is the second-tier competition in the futsal sports competition structure organized by Indonesian Futsal Federation. This competition started in the 2015 season.

List of champions

List of best players

List of top-goalscorers

See also 
 Nusantara Women's Futsal League

References 

Sports competitions in Indonesia